"I Want You" is a song written by songwriters Leon Ware and Arthur "T-Boy" Ross and performed by singer Marvin Gaye. It was released as a single in 1976 on his fourteenth studio album of the same name on the Tamla label. The song introduced a change in musical styles for Gaye, who before then had been recording songs with a funk edge. Songs such as this gave him a disco audience thanks to Ware, who produced the song alongside Gaye.

The song also stood to be one of Marvin's most popular singles during his later Motown period followed by his sabbatical following the release of 1973's Let's Get It On. The song eventually reached number fifteen on the Billboard Hot 100 and number one on the Hot Selling Soul Singles chart. It also became a disco hit, reaching number ten on the Disco Singles Chart alongside "After the Dance".

Background
Originally conceived by Motown songwriter Leon Ware and his songwriting partner "T-Boy" Ross, it was originally intended to be included in Ware's Musical Massage album. When Ware, who was also signed to the label as a solo artist, presented the rough draught of his album to Motown-CEO Berry Gordy, the mogul was appreciative of the songs, including a rough version of "I Want You". But after hearing it, he convinced Ware to give some of the songs to Gaye, who was coming off the release of his acclaimed 1973 record, Let's Get It On, his final duet recording with Diana Ross and a commercially successful live album and was coming off a US tour at the time. Marvin, who called himself a perfectionist, had struggled with creating a follow-up album to Let's Get It On. When Ware played Gaye the rough draft of "I Want You", Gaye, then inspired by his relationship with his girlfriend Janis Hunter, was motivated to record a convincing performance of the song, which was about a man trying to convince a wayward lover that he wanted the woman to love him as much as he loved her.

Purportedly recorded at Marvin's Room, the singer's new recording studio in Los Angeles, Gaye also reportedly recorded the song while lying on the back of his sofa according to Ware, who said that he couldn't see Gaye at first but then discovered a laid-back Marvin delivering the song in his trademark tenor vocals.

Composition
The song was a fusion of different genres, an unusual mix for Gaye. The instrumentation included strings, then an important ingredient to soul and disco-styled music in the seventies, bongos, bell tree, percussive congas added a jazz feel to the song, the bass guitar notes and guitar riffs bring in a funk ingredient, while additional guitar (provided by Ray Parker Jr., by now a Los Angeles session musician) put in an added rock element. 

Gaye's lead vocals brought in both falsetto and a gospel approach near the ending coda of the song. The single version features alternate lead vocal takes. Additional vocals, later added to Gaye's deluxe edition re-issue of I Want You, showcase two different lead vocal takes by Gaye. The background vocals, all sung by Gaye, recalled Marvin's early doo-wop roots.

Reception
Released a day before Marvin's 37th birthday in 1976, the single was released a month after its similarly titled parent album was released, the single gained success on both the Billboard Hot 100 and Hot Soul Singles chart, eventually peaking at number fifteen on the Hot 100 and number-one on the R&B chart. The single's light-disco/soul approach helped the song gained a club audience after it was combined with the album's second single, "After the Dance" and peaked at number-ten on the Billboard Hot Dance/Club Play chart, Marvin's first single on that chart. Eventually the song would help its self-titled album sell over a million copies. Marvin would also be nominated with a Grammy Award for Best R&B Male Vocal Performance, losing out to Stevie Wonder for his hit, "I Wish".

Record World said that the song "features a seductive vocal that massages a chunky trance-like rhythm" and has an "appropriately lush arrangement."

Charts

Cover versions
In 1976, Argentinian tenor saxophonist Gato Barbieri covered "I Want You" on his album "Caliente!".
https://www.allmusic.com/song/i-want-you-mt0001081286

In the same year, a large personnel participated in a cover of the song from Stanley Turrentine's The Man with the Sad Face.

In 1990, British singer Robert Palmer covered "I Want You" as a medley with another Marvin Gaye song, "Mercy Mercy Me". The song was released as the third single from his tenth studio album, Don't Explain, in January 1991. The song reached number nine in the United Kingdom, six in Canada and sixteen pop (and four Adult Contemporary) in the United States.

In 2003, Michael McDonald covered "I Want You" on his album "Motown".

In 2022, Kendrick Lamar sampled and interpolated "I Want You" on the standalone non-album single "The Heart Part 5", released prior to his album Mr. Morale & the Big Steppers. It later became available as a bonus track on the album.

Madonna and Massive Attack version

Background
American singer Madonna recorded a cover version of "I Want You" with British trip-hop group Massive Attack for the Marvin Gaye tribute album Inner City Blues: The Music of Marvin Gaye (1995) and Madonna's ballad compilation album Something to Remember (1995). It was slated to be the first single from Something to Remember; a music video was shot and released to many media outlets, but legality problems between the Motown label and Madonna's record label prevented this from happening. Massive Attack later included the song on the special edition of their greatest hits compilation Collected in 2006.

Over a year before the release of the album Motown Records, the record label in charge of assembling the artists for the compilation album approached Massive Attack and asked them to pick a song from Marvin Gaye's back catalogue to re-imagine and suggested they do a collaboration with Chaka Khan. A backing track was made to accommodate her vocals, but the recording sessions did not go well. The possibility came up briefly of working with Aaron Neville but this fell through as well because of legality issues.

Record producer Nellee Hooper suggested Madonna as vocalist, as he had recently finished producing her 1994 Bedtime Stories album, and he set up a meeting with Massive Attack. Band members Daddy G and Mushroom never got the opportunity to meet Madonna during the recording sessions for the song, only 3D along with Hooper would meet with her in New York for a period of two days, record the vocals with her and then bring them back to their home city of Bristol to be worked on. Madonna was so impressed by the finished product that she chose to include the song as the first track on her 1995 compilation album Something to Remember.

Reception
AllMusic editor Stephen Thomas Erlewine said that "I Want You" is the most notable among the three new tracks on Something to Remember. In a review for Inner City Blues: The Music of Marvin Gaye, Erlewine also wrote "A few tracks stand out from the mire, particularly Madonna and Massive Attack's trip-hop re-interpretation of "I Want You"..." Jim Farber of the New York Daily News stated that "[Madonna] has never sounded better than in the cover of Marvin Gaye's "I Want You"."

Music video
"I Want You" was shot on August 5 and 6, 1995 at Silvercup Studios in Long Island City, New York and directed by Earle Sebastian, produced by Joel Hinman, edited by Bruce Ashley, the video was inspired by and pays homage to A Telephone Call, a short story written by American writer, Dorothy Parker. The video was released to VH1 on October 2, 1995. "I Want You" received a nomination for "MTV Amour" at the MTV Europe Music Awards 1996, but lost to The Fugees's "Killing Me Softly". The video was commercially released in 2009 on Madonna's video compilation, Celebration: The Video Collection.

References

External links
 [ Allmusic.com article about the Marvin Gaye version of "I Want You"]
 BBC Review of I Want You album

1975 songs
1976 singles
Marvin Gaye songs
Madonna songs
Diana Ross songs
Massive Attack songs
Motown singles
Song recordings produced by Nellee Hooper
Songs written by Leon Ware
Songs written by Arthur "T-Boy" Ross
Song recordings produced by Marvin Gaye
Tamla Records singles
Trip hop songs